IDA Bollaram, also known as Bollaram Industrial Area, is located in the village of Bollaram, in Jinnaram mandal of the Sangareddy district of Telangana, India. It is a part of Hyderabad metropolitan region.

It is surrounded by Bachupally, Miyapur, Ameenpur. There are many buses available from Miyapur and Kukatpally to IDA Bollarum.

Industries
Many industries are located here like Rampex labs, Dr. Reddy's Labs, Khetan, Coca-Cola, Sujana, Mylan, Aparna, Aurobindo pharma and many others.*

References

External links 
 IDA Bollaram
 Greenpeace Pollution Report 
 A.P. Pollution Control Board Report (See map on last page of the PDF)
 Directory of Pharmaceutical Manufacturing Units in India 2007 
 TRACE ELEMENT CONTAMINATION IN GROUND WATERS OF MIYAPUR AND BOLLARAM, HYDERABAD, ANDHRA PRADESH, INDIA

 

Neighbourhoods in Hyderabad, India

Villages in Sangareddy district
Economy of Telangana
Industrial parks in India